Nangal is a village located in the Sikar district of the Indian  state Rajasthan. It is 11 km away from Palsana, 10 km from Khandela, 3 km from Bamanwas and 3.5 km away from Dudhwalo ka Bass.

Demographics

Nangal village has a population of about 3,000 people. However, because it covers a big area, population of the village was 2,287 according to census in 2001. The population density of the village was 29 according to the same census. Males constitute 52% of the population. Nangal has an average literacy rate of 92.98% as per the 2011 census, higher than the state average of 67.05%: male literacy is 86.66%, and female literacy is 58.76%. In Sikar, 16% of the population is under 6 years of age.

The main caste groups are Balai, Kharra, Mawliya,  Kumawats, Jats, Gujjars/Meenas, and functionary caste as Khati, Lohar, Sunar and Nai are also found in Nangal and nearest villages like Abhaypura.

Education

Area

Population (2001)

Rain

See also
 Sikar district
 Sikar (Lok Sabha constituency)

References

External links
 Genealogy of Sikar Rulers
 Sikar District web site
 Photogallery of Sikar

Villages in Sikar district